Taxes in Bulgaria are collected on both state and local levels. The most important taxes are collected on state level, these taxes include income tax, social security, corporate taxes and value added tax. On the local level, property taxes as well as various fees are collected. All income earned in Bulgaria is taxed on a flat rate of 10%. Employment income earned in Bulgaria is also subject to various social security insurance contributions. In total the employee pays 12.9% and the employer contributes what corresponds to 17.9%.  Corporate income tax is also a flat 10%. Value-Added Tax applies at a flat rate of 20% on virtually all goods and services. A lower rate of 9% applies on only hotel services.

Bulgarian state taxes are administered by the National Revenue Agency (NRA). The National Assembly has the power to lay and collect Taxes, Duties, Imposts, and Excises. The municipal council shall determine the rate of local taxes.

History 
Taxation in Bulgaria has shifted depending on which government was in control. During the First Bulgarian Empire taxes were paid in kind while during the Second Bulgarian Empire taxation was monetary. Under the Ottoman control of Bulgaria, Christian citizens were subject to a tax called the dhimmi, levied by the Ottoman authority. During the socialist period of planned economy, taxation was similar to that of the rest of the Soviet, often with a turnover tax and taxes on government run businesses. After the end of the Soviet era, large privatization took place and the turnover tax was replaced with an ordinary Value-Added Tax.

Tax law 
The tax legislation in Bulgaria includes the principles of establishment and functioning of the tax system.
The Bulgarian tax system imposes taxes upon both legal entities and individuals, whereas three main groups of taxes can be discerned: direct taxes (corporate tax, income tax of 10%, indirect taxes (value-added tax) and local taxes and fees (succession tax).
The National Revenue Agency is the main governmental body in Bulgaria responsible for tax collection.
In Bulgaria, the material tax law is regulated by the laws of the different tax types and the procedural law - by the Tax-Insurance Procedure Code
(Bulg: Данъчно-осигурителен процесуален кодекс).

The value-added tax 

VAT taxation under Bulgarian tax law is regulated by Value Added Tax Act (VATA) (Bulg: Закон за данък върху добавената стойност), the Regulation for the Application of VATA (RAVATA) and Directive 2006/112 -COUNCIL DIRECTIVE 2006/112/EC of 28 November 2006 on the common system of value added tax.
This type of indirect tax is payable monthly for all supplies of goods or services for any intra-European Union acquisition whose place of performance is within the country, carried out by a registered person, as well as for importation of goods. VAT is a tax levied on newly created value during the implementation process of goods or services. The tax is levied on the consumption thereof and the group of turnover taxes. The VAT model under Bulgarian law follows the common VAT regime within the EU model, where personal expenses are taxable by applying the credit (invoice) method. According to this method, each stage of production of goods or services and the implementation thereof to end users is chargeable with VAT on the entire value of the supply, such that through the mechanism of tax credit the final price of the goods or services includes a single VAT charge in the amount of the respective tax rate.
A taxable person is any person who independently carries out an economic activity, whatever the purpose and results of that activity, as well as any person who performs accidental onerous intra-European Union supplies of new transport vehicles. „Independent economic activity” are the activities of producers, traders and persons supplying services, including mining and agriculture, as well as the practice of a liberal profession, including as private enforcement agents and notaries.

Registration under VATA 
In order for a taxable person to be part of the taxation procedure under VATA, the same needs to be registered for VAT purposes. VAT registration and its termination are regulated in Arts. 94 - 111, as well as in Arts. 132-135. This registration forms part of the general tax registration under TIPC. Until registered, a taxable person has no rights and obligations under VATA.
VAT registration can be compulsory, voluntary and on the initiative of the revenue administration, such that the law outlines several situations where specific registration and deregistration apply. Special cases of compulsory registration are separately provided for.

Objects of VAT taxation: objects of taxation are supplies of goods and services; intra-European Union acquisitions; importation of goods.

1.	any onerous taxable supply of goods and services
2.	intra-European Union acquisition: acquiring ownership of goods and the actual receipt of goods which are dispatched or transported to the territory of the country from that of another MS, where the supplier is a taxable person who is registered for VAT purposes in another MS. Cases of non-intra-European Union acquisitions are listed in Art.13 (4).
3.	Imports: introduction of non-European Union goods - import of goods and placing goods in free circulation after outward processing. As import of goods is also considered any other event resulting in a customs duty.

Tax rate and tax amount 

Art. 66 VATA provides for the following tax rates:
A standard 20% rate, which applicable to taxable supplies, except for those expressly specified as subject to a zero rate; the importation of goods into the territory of the country; the taxable intra-European Union acquisitions.
The tax applicable to accommodation provided at hotels and similar establishments, including the provision of vacation accommodation and letting out of places for camping sites or caravan sites, is 9%.
The tax amount is determined by multiplying the taxable amount by the rate of tax (Art. 67 VATA).

VAT return (Art. 125 VATA) 

For every tax period, the registered person shall submit a VAT return, prepared on the basis of the ledger of purchases and ledger of sales.
This requirement does not apply to services performed electronically by persons who are not established within the European Union. A registered person, who has effected intra-European Union supplies, supplies as an intermediary in a triangular operation or supplies of services under Art. 21 (2) with the place of supply within the territory of another Member State for the tax period, must submit a VIES return on the said supplies for the relevant tax period together with the VAT return (Art. 125 (1) and (2) VATA).
Together with the VAT return the registered person must submit the ledger of purchases and ledger of sales for the relevant tax period. VAT returns must furthermore be submitted where there is no payable or refundable tax, as well as in the cases where the registered person has not effected or received any supplies or acquisitions or has effected any importation for the said tax period. The returns and the ledgers of accounts must be submitted on or before the 14th day of the month following the tax period to which the said returns and ledgers refer.

The corporate tax in Bulgaria 

The tax obligations, tentative taxes, tax reliefs and the taxation regime of legal persons and their incomes are regulated by the rules of the Corporate Income Tax Act (Bulg: Закон за корпоративното подоходно облагане). According to Article 1, the profits of all resident and foreign legal entities whose activities’ focus is in Bulgaria are taxable in accordance with the Bulgarian legislation. The different types of taxpayers are enumerated in Article 2 of the Act - this includes all resident and foreign legal persons whose main activity is in Bulgaria or who derive their income from a source in Bulgaria. Furthermore, subject to taxation are the foreign organizationally and financially independent entities which are engaged in an independent business activity or investment control, provided that the owner of the income cannot be determined.

According to Article 20 of the Act the rate of the corporate income tax is 10%. It is a flat tax.

There are different rules governing the taxation of domestic and foreign legal persons. The domestic legal persons are taxable with respect to all gains from domestic and foreign sources, whereas foreign companies - only with respect to their operations in Bulgaria and the resulting gains and incomes from them. The annual taxable income is to be declared up to 31 March of the next year.
The corporate tax in Bulgaria is an annual. The law provides for payment of two types of advance contributions: monthly advance contributions and quarterly advance contributions. Exempt from advance contributions are the following classes of taxable persons:
1.	Taxable persons, whose net income of sales for the preceding year does not exceed BGN 300,000;
2.	Newly constituted taxable persons for the year of their constitution, except those newly constituted as a result of a transformation under the Commerce Act (CA)  (Bulg: Търговски закон). If the transformation is carried out by changing its legal form, the newly constituted entity under Art. 264 CA is subject to advance contributions under the general order.
These persons may nevertheless make quarterly advance contributions, such that in this case they would not owe interest if it appears that, in view of the profits realised, contributions would have had to be larger.

Statement of corporate tax 

The corporate tax is declared by 31 March of the subsequent year of its occurrence. The tax return form is to be submitted at the territorial directorate of the National Revenue Agency for registration of taxable person.
To encourage the electronic submission of documents, the legislature has provided for a preference. Taxable persons that submit an annual tax statement and annual activity report by 31 March of the subsequent year electronically and pay their corporate tax within the same time limit, enjoy a relief of 1 per cent of the annual corporate tax due, however, this relief may not exceed BGN 1,000 (Art. 92 (5) of CITA).

Withholding tax in Bulgaria 

The most widespread type of withholding taxes is colloquially referred to as "dividend tax". The withholding tax on dividends and liquidation proceeds which were distributed in favor of foreign or national legal persons from a local company are subject to taxation in Bulgaria. Foreign legal entities’ profits originating either from business activity performed through a certain location of business activity inside the territory of the Republic of Bulgaria or from disposal of the property of such a location of business activity are to be considered income from a source within the country - Article 12 of the Law on corporate income taxation. The withholding tax is final. The tax rate on dividends and liquidation proceeds is 5%. If the incomes have been received from other non-commercial revenues, such as rent, author rights, etc., the tax rate is 10%.

Statement of tax withheld at the source 

The statement of tax withheld at the source is performed quarterly by the end of the month following the quarter.
Persons who are obliged to withhold and pay tax at the source under Art. 194 and Art. 195, need to declare the due tax for the quarter through a declaration according to a form. A new addition is that the declaration is submitted for the taxes due and not the withheld and paid taxes at the source. The statement is filed with the territorial directorate of the National Revenue Agency, either by registration of the payer of the income or by the place in which the payer of the income must have registered (where the payer of the income is not subject to registration, the tax return is to be filed with the territorial directorate of the National Revenue Agency - Sofia).
Subject to statement submission are also the taxes withheld at the source on income from dividends and liquidation shares accruing to the benefit of local legal persons who are not traders.
In cases where the payer of the income is a person who is not required to withhold and remit taxes, the tax return is submitted by the income recipient until the end of the month following the quarter.

Payment of tax withheld at the source 

The period for payment of the tax is until the end of the month following the quarter in which the tax liability arose (Art. 202 (1) and (2) of CITA).
The tax due is paid in the respective territorial directorate of the National Revenue Agency by registration of the payer of the income or by the place in which the payer of the income must have registered. Where the payer of the income is not subject to registration, the tax is paid in the Territorial directorate of the National Revenue Agency - Sofia (Art. 202 (3) and (4) of CITA). Overpaid tax is recovered by the territorial directorate of the National Revenue Agency, in which the tax is payable. When the tax is not withheld and paid accordingly, it is due jointly by the taxable persons of such income.

Taxes on expenses 

The tax on expenses is performed in accordance with Art. 217 (1) CITA by the taxpayer with an annual income tax return. The tax on expenses is accrued on the annual basis of taxation and is paid once until 31 March of the following year.
The main group of taxable persons are local legal entities and foreign legal entities by place of business within the country. Therein are also included sole proprietors in respect of taxes withheld at source on expenses, as well as in cases where they are subject to an alternative tax.
For the purposes of taxation under Bulgarian law the key term is "local legal entity". Art. 3 of CITA states that "local" are:
•	legal entities established under Bulgarian legislation (for the purposes of tax law, unincorporated associations and insurance funds under CSR are treated as legal entities, as well as NGOs – for profit realized within the country);
•	companies established under Regulation (EC) No. 2157/2001 of the Council, and cooperative societies established under Regulation (EC) No. 1435/2003 of the Council where they have their registered office within the country and are entered in a Bulgarian register
Local legal entities are taxed on their profit and income from all sources within Bulgaria and abroad. In terms of realized profits and taxes paid abroad, the provisions apply of the relevant treaties for the avoidance of double taxation (Double Taxation Treaties or DTT) apply or to recognize the right of deduction under CITA.

Income Taxes on Natural Persons Act in Bulgaria 
The Income Taxes on Natural Persons Act (ITNPA) (Bulg: Закон за данъците върху доходите на физическите лица) in Bulgaria regulates the taxation of income of both local and foreign natural persons, including income originating from their business activity. With regard to the income of sole proprietors in Bulgaria, the ITNPA refers to the taxation regime under the Corporate Income Tax Act. Income received from patent activity is taxed in accordance with the Local Taxes and Fees Act.
The ITNPA entered into force on 01.01.2007, and on 01.01.2008 it introduced drastic changes to legislation –progressive tax was replaced by a flat tax system. As a general principle, taxable income is the whole income of the natural person, including that which originates from a source abroad (principle of worldwide income taxation), whereas foreign persons only owe tax on income originating from a source in Bulgaria (territorial principle). Citizenship is not a factor when differentiating between the local and foreign persons. Pursuant to Art. 4, regardless of their citizenship, a local natural person is a person:
	whose permanent place of residence is in Bulgaria, or
	who spends inside the territory of Bulgaria more than 183 days in each period of 12 consecutive months, or
	who resides abroad on assignment of the Bulgarian State, its authorities and/or its organizations, or Bulgarian establishments, and the members of their family shall also be local natural persons, or
	who has their centre of vital interests in Bulgaria. The centre of vital interests is in Bulgaria when the interests of the person are closely related to the country. In the course of determining those interests, different factors may be taken into consideration - family, property, the place in which the person carries out their employment, professional or business activity, etc.

Object of taxation is income originating from labour and non-labour relationships of natural persons, income from rent, management of real estate or the transfer of rights. The tax is annual.

This article examines the main provisions related to the "flat tax" in the Republic of Bulgaria.

The introduction of the flat tax offers the following advantages:
	reducing the tax burden on the rich, which should lead to an increase in consumption, savings and investment, and hence stimulate economic growth;
	increasing tax collection due to the onerous and simplified procedure for its implementation;
	combating the grey economy, because evasion of tax and insurance contributions could become more expensive than their due payment; attracting the interest of foreign investors due to the low size of the tax.

Tax reliefs 

The Act provides for the following tax reliefs:
	Tax relief for persons with reduced working capacity (Art. 18 ITNPA).
	Tax relief for personal contributions for voluntary insurance (Art. 19 ITNPA).
	Tax relief for personal contributions for insurance length of service has been preserved (Art. 20).
	A sequence was introduced for the application of tax reliefs (Art. 21).
	Tax relief for donations;
	22а introduced a tax relief for young families.
	Tax relief for children;
	Tax relief for children with disabilities.

Local taxes in The Republic of Bulgaria 

Local taxes are needed by local authorities to provide a more comprehensive and quality services and to align these services with the needs of the local population. The following local taxes are paid into the municipal budget: real estate tax; succession tax; donation tax; property acquisition tax; transport vehicle tax; patent tax; other local taxes stipulated by the law.

The amount of local taxes is determined by the municipal council in accordance with the Local Taxes and Fees Act (LTFA) (Bulg: Закон за местните данъци и такси) but within fixed limits set by law by the National Assembly. By the end of the preceding year, the municipal council determines by ordinance the exact taxable amounts of the year to follow. Making changes during the year is not permissible.

Local fees in the Republic of Bulgaria 

The local fees collectable within the territory of the Republic of Bulgaria include:
	household waste disposal,
	retail markets, wholesale markets, fairs, sidewalks, squares, and street roadways use,
	crèches, child-food kitchens, kindergartens, specialized social services institutions, camps, dormitories, and other municipal social services usage;
	technical services,
	administrative services,
	purchase of graveyard plots,
	dog ownership;
	other local fees stipulated by the law;

Local taxes are paid in cash at the cash desks of the municipal administration, or to the relevant bank account. (Art. 2 LTFA).
Violation of the LTFA provisions could lead to the imposition of a range of penalties. Failure to submit a statement of acquisition of real estate or declaring incorrect data so as to reduce the tax to a lower rate, is punishable with a fine - from BGN 10 to BGN 400 for natural persons and from BGN 100 to BGN 1,000 for legal entities.

Taxes on transport vehicles 

This tax is levied on legal and natural persons, who own motor vehicles registered for operation on the road network in the Republic of Bulgaria, ships registered in the Bulgarian ports, as well as aircraft recorded in the state register of civil aircraft of the Republic of Bulgaria.
If the owners of transport vehicles have no permanent address within the territory of the country, the declarations are to be submitted to the municipality where the transport vehicle is registered.

The amount of the transport vehicle tax is determined by the municipal council in compliance with the terms, conditions and limits set by the LTFA (according to Art. 1 (2) LTFA). For instance:
	For passenger automobiles the taxable amount is determined according to engine power adjusted by a coefficient depending on the year of manufacture;
	For buses the taxable amount is determined by the number of seats;
	For cargo trucks of up to 12 tons of permissible maximum weight the taxable amount is a fixed sum per each ton of load-carrying capacity;
	For motorcycles the taxable amount is the absolute amount depending on the cubic capacity of the engine.

The taxation regime of transport vehicles in Bulgaria is regulated in Art. 52-61 of the Local Taxes and Fees Act (LTFA).

Real estate tax in Bulgaria 

In Bulgaria the real estate tax, also called "buildings tax" is levied on buildings and land located within the territory of the country and within the spatial planning areas of settlements, as well as the lands outside such areas, whose intended use, according to a detailed construction plan, falls within Art. 8, item 1 of the Spatial Planning Act and after change of the purpose of the land where that is required by special legislative statute (Art. 10 Local Taxes and Fees Act, or LTFA).

Under Art. 11 LTFA, tax is levied on:
	owners of taxable real estate;
	owners of buildings constructed on state or municipal land;
	person who was given a right of use - in rem (in deed);
	person who was given a right of use - concession (concessionaire);
	users of restituted property that has been restored to the owners, but cannot be used by them (for a period of 5 years)

No tax is levied on:
	sites occupied by streets, roads of the national and municipal road networks, and the railway network, up to the limiting construction lines;
	lands occupied by water basins which are state and municipal property
	agricultural land and forests, with the exception of land with buildings and only for the built area and the adjoining it land
	real estate with tax assessment of BGN 1680 inclusive.

The Bulgarian succession tax 

According to the Bulgarian legislation regulating local taxes, succession tax is levied on estate succeeded by law or by will within Bulgaria or abroad by Bulgarian citizens as well as on the estate located within Bulgaria succeeded by foreign nationals. The succeeded estate includes the movable and immovable property owned by the decedent and the rights over such property, as well as their other property rights, receivables and liabilities at the time of opening of the succession, unless otherwise provided by legislative statute. The inherited estate is subject to deductions as to the obligations and tax reliefs laid down in Bulgarian law, or in those cases where it is inherited by the state.

Art. 38 lists the types of property that are tax free:
	property passed to the State or municipalities;
	ordinary household furnishings;
	pensions not received by the decedent;
	estate of Bulgarian citizens located abroad to which the succession tax of the respective state has applied.

Taxable persons are:
	heirs by law, such that as of 2004, succession tax in Bulgaria does not apply to the surviving spouse and the lineal heirs;
	testamentary heirs, beneficiaries and legatees;
	stateless persons are subject to the succession tax for inherited estate on the territory of Bulgaria, if the person in question has been permanently resident within the territory of Bulgaria (Art. 29 LTFA).

The heirs may waive the succession through a unilateral act and as a result, they are subject to the succession tax. The waiver needs to be express, written and recorded in a specific book at the District Court. In case there is more than one heir, the tax is due in accordance with their share, and the taxable amount depends on the degree of kinship and the size of the inherited share. The tax is determined and communicated to each co-heir - Art. 106 and Art. 107 TIPC.

Persons that have become heirs by law or will, legatees or their legal representatives are obliged to file a tax return in the municipality within six months, such that the period is calculated differently – starting from the moment of opening of the succession or of learning about the succession. Exempt from this six-month period is inherited property whose existence became known to the heirs or legatees after six months. In this case, the time limit is one month from learning about the succession and on the basis of a submitted declaration. Any declaration submitted in time by one heir benefits the other heirs as well. Failure to submit the declaration results in an administrative liability.

Literature 

 Tax law and tax process – Ivan G. Stoyanov (Feneia, Sofia 2012) 
 Taxation 2015 Commentory – Rosen Ivanov (Ciela, Sofia 2015)

References

External links 
 Bulgarian National Revenue Agency website

Economy of Bulgaria
Law of Bulgaria
Bulgaria